Events in the year 1917 in Spain.

Incumbents
Monarch: Alfonso XIII
President of the Council of Ministers:
until 19 April: Álvaro Figueroa Torres
19 April – 11 June: Manuel García Prieto 
11 June – 3 November: Eduardo Dato Iradier 
starting 3 November: Manuel García Prieto

Events 

 18 January – "Manifiesto de la Liga Antigermanófila" ('Manifesto of the Anti-Germanophile League') published in La España.
 25 June – the  made their manifesto public.
 13 August – Beginning of the 1917 general strike.
 11 November 1917 – Municipal elections.

Undated 
 Spanish crisis of 1917

Births
 23 January – Encarna Hernández, basketball player and coach (died 2022).
 1 February – José Luis Sampedro, economist and human rights activist (died 2013).
 20 April – María Silva Cruz, "La Libertaria", anarchist known for the 1933 Casas Viejas uprising (died 1936).
 21 April – María Isbert, actress (died 2011).
 1 July – Álvaro Domecq y Díez, aristocrat (died 2005)
 4 July – Manolete, bullfighter (died 1947).
 6 July – Heribert Barrera, Catalan nationalist politician (died 2011).
 28 July – Gloria Fuertes, writer of children's literature (died 1998).
 20 September – Fernando Rey, film, tv and theatre actor (died 1994).
 25 December – Alejandro Rodríguez de Valcárcel, falangist politician, acting head of state in November 1975 (died 1976).

Deaths 
 21 February – Joaquín Dicenta, journalist, novelist, playwright, poet and Republican politician (born 1862).
 1 August – Enric Prat de la Riba, Catalan nationalist, lawyer and writer (born 1870).
 18 August – Ricardo de Madrazo, painter best known for his Orientalist works (born 1852).
 15 December – Gumersindo de Azcárate, Krausist educator, philosopher and Republican politician (born 1840).
 22 December – Pío Gullón e Iglesias, lawyer, journalist and politician (born 1835).

References

 
Years of the 20th century in Spain
1910s in Spain
Spain
Spain